N-acetyltransferase 8 is a protein that in humans is encoded by the NAT8 gene.

Clinical relevance
Mutations in the NAT8 gene have been associated with chronic kidney disease.

References

Further reading

EC 2.3.1